High Halstow Halt was a halt between Cliffe and Sharnal Street stations on the Hundred of Hoo Railway. It was opened in July 1906 and closed to passengers on 4 December 1961. The halt was 1¾ miles from Cliffe station.

References

Sources

External links
 Subterranea Britannica
 High Halstow Halt station on navigable 1940 O. S. map

Disused railway stations in Kent
Former South Eastern Railway (UK) stations
Railway stations in Great Britain opened in 1906
Railway stations in Great Britain closed in 1961
Transport in Medway